The Access Fund is a not-for-profit rock climbing advocacy group in the US.  Their goals are twofold. First, keeping climbing areas open and gaining access to currently closed climbing areas. Second, they promote an ethic of responsible climbing and conservation of the climbing environment. The Access Fund was originally the access committee of the American Alpine Club and was created as the climbing community realized the need for an organization to represent climbing and climbers' rights in the US.

The Access Fund became its own 501(c)3 organization in 1991. The organization is based out of Boulder, Colorado and has a small full-time staff. Additionally, the Access Fund has a nationwide network of volunteers and local climbing organizations that work locally to keep climbing areas open and preserved for future climbers.

Footnotes

External links 
Web Site
An Auspicious Infancy: The Earliest Days of the Access Fund
California Mountaineering Group
 Mid Atlantic Climbers, an Access Fund affiliate organization focusing on climbing areas in the Mid Atlantic Region

Access Fund, The